Okauia is a rural settlement and community located east of Matamata, in the Waikato region of New Zealand's North Island.

The New Zealand Ministry for Culture and Heritage gives a translation of "place of articles threaded on a stick" for Ōkauia.

Wairere Falls, the highest waterfall in the North Island, is northeast of Okauia.

Marae

The area includes three marae affiliated with the Ngāti Hinerangi iwi:

 Hinerangi Tawhaki Marae is affiliated with the hapū of Ngāti Rangi, Ngāti Tamapango, Ngāti Tawhaki and Uri o Tangata.
 Tamapango Marae is affiliated with the hapū of Ngāti Rangi, Ngāti Tamapango and Ngāti Tawhaki.
 Te Ōhākī Marae is affiliated with the hapū of Ngāti Kura, Ngāti Te Riha, Ngāti Tokotoko and Ngāti Whakamaungarangi.

Another local marae, Tangata Marae, is affiliated with the Ngāti Raukawa iwi and its Ngāti Hinerangi hapū. In October 2020, the Government committed $1,259,392 from the Provincial Growth Fund to upgrade Tangata Marae and 7 other Ngāti Raukawa marae, creating 18 jobs.

Demographics
Okauia settlement is in two SA1 statistical areas, which cover . The SA1 areas are part of the larger Okauia statistical area.

Okauia had a population of 306 at the 2018 New Zealand census, a decrease of 6 people (−1.9%) since the 2013 census, and an increase of 51 people (20.0%) since the 2006 census. There were 111 households, comprising 165 males and 144 females, giving a sex ratio of 1.15 males per female, with 72 people (23.5%) aged under 15 years, 60 (19.6%) aged 15 to 29, 135 (44.1%) aged 30 to 64, and 42 (13.7%) aged 65 or older.

Ethnicities were 79.4% European/Pākehā, 18.6% Māori, 3.9% Pacific peoples, 5.9% Asian, and 1.0% other ethnicities. People may identify with more than one ethnicity.

Although some people chose not to answer the census's question about religious affiliation, 44.1% had no religion, 47.1% were Christian, 2.9% had Māori religious beliefs and 1.0% had other religions.

Of those at least 15 years old, 33 (14.1%) people had a bachelor's or higher degree, and 45 (19.2%) people had no formal qualifications. 33 people (14.1%) earned over $70,000 compared to 17.2% nationally. The employment status of those at least 15 was that 132 (56.4%) people were employed full-time, 45 (19.2%) were part-time, and 9 (3.8%) were unemployed.

Okauia statistical area

Okauia statistical area had a population of 1,041 at the 2018 New Zealand census, an increase of 69 people (7.1%) since the 2013 census, and an increase of 150 people (16.8%) since the 2006 census. There were 378 households, comprising 537 males and 504 females, giving a sex ratio of 1.07 males per female. The median age was 37.4 years (compared with 37.4 years nationally), with 231 people (22.2%) aged under 15 years, 210 (20.2%) aged 15 to 29, 471 (45.2%) aged 30 to 64, and 129 (12.4%) aged 65 or older.

Ethnicities were 87.0% European/Pākehā, 13.8% Māori, 2.0% Pacific peoples, 4.9% Asian, and 1.7% other ethnicities. People may identify with more than one ethnicity.

The percentage of people born overseas was 16.4, compared with 27.1% nationally.

Although some people chose not to answer the census's question about religious affiliation, 51.0% had no religion, 39.2% were Christian, 1.2% had Māori religious beliefs, 0.6% were Hindu, 0.9% were Muslim, 0.3% were Buddhist and 1.2% had other religions.

Of those at least 15 years old, 105 (13.0%) people had a bachelor's or higher degree, and 165 (20.4%) people had no formal qualifications. The median income was $38,400, compared with $31,800 nationally. 150 people (18.5%) earned over $70,000 compared to 17.2% nationally. The employment status of those at least 15 was that 465 (57.4%) people were employed full-time, 138 (17.0%) were part-time, and 21 (2.6%) were unemployed.

See also
 List of towns in New Zealand

References

Populated places in Waikato
Matamata-Piako District